This is a list of Los Angeles Historic-Cultural Monuments in the San Fernando Valley, California.  It includes Historic-Cultural Monuments in the San Fernando Valley as well as the adjacent Crescenta Valley.  In total, there are more than 70 Historic-Cultural Monuments (HCM) in the San Fernando and Crescenta Valleys.  A handful of additional historic sites in the valleys have been designated as California Historical Landmarks or listed on the National Register of Historic Places.  The sites that are within City of Los Angeles borders are covered by two commissions of the Los Angeles Department of City Planning: the North Valley Area Planning Commission and the South Valley Area Planning Commission. They are designated by the City's Cultural Heritage Commission.

Overview of the Valley's Historic-Cultural Monuments

The Historic-Cultural Monuments in the San Fernando Valley are spread across the Valley from Chatsworth in the northwest to Studio City in the southeast, and from the City of Calabasas in the southwest to Tujunga and La Crescenta in the northeast.

When the Los Angeles Cultural Heritage Board was formed in 1962, its first-designated sites were HCM #1 (Leonis Adobe) and HCM #2 (Bolton Hall), both located in the San Fernando/Crescenta Valleys.

The oldest building in the Valley is the Convento Building at the Mission San Fernando Rey de España, which was built between 1808 and 1822.  Other monuments directly related to the Mission San Fernando include the kiln in Chatsworth used to make bricks and tiles for the mission, the wells and settling basin in Sylmar used to supply water to the mission, and the Pioneer Cemetery where Mission Indians as well as Valley pioneers are buried.

In addition to the structures at the Mission, two adobe structures, Rómulo Pico Adobe built in 1834 and Leonis Adobe built in the 1840s, rank among the oldest in the Valley.

Eleven of the monuments located in the Valley have also been listed on the National Register of Historic Places.  They are: Leonis Adobe, Bolton Hall, Rómulo Pico Adobe, the Convento Building at the Mission San Fernando, Campo de Cahuenga, Minnie Hill Palmer House, Los Encinos State Historic Park, Portal of the Folded Wings Shrine to Aviation, the Old Stage Coach Trail through the Santa Susana Mountains, and the North Hollywood and Van Nuys branch libraries.

Churches and other places of worship are well represented on the list, including the Chatsworth Community Church (1903), Faith Bible Church in Northridge (1917), the Saint Saviour's Chapel at Harvard-Westlake School in Studio City, and the David Familian Chapel of Temple Adat Ari El at the Valley's first Jewish synagogue in North Hollywood.

The role of trees in the development of the Valley is celebrated with monument listings for a 1,000-year-old oak tree in Encino (removed in 1996), 114 Himalayan Deodar trees along White Oak in Granada Hills, 76 mature olive trees along Lassen Street in Chatsworth, and 300 pepper trees lining in Canoga Avenue in Woodland Hills.

Current and former Historic-Cultural Monuments

{|class="wikitable sortable" style="width:98%"
!  width=1% | HCM #
!  width="18%" |Landmark name
! class="unsortable"  width="11%" |Image
!  width="4%"  |Date designated
!  width="12%" |Locality
!  width="12%" |Neighborhood
! class="unsortable"  width="41%" |Description
|-
| |1
| Leonis Adobe
| 
| 
| 23537 Calabasas Rd.
| Calabasas, but within the limits of Woodland Hills, city of Los Angeles
| Monterey-style adobe residence built in the 1840s and occupied by Miguel Leonis ("one of the most colorful, influential and prominent figures of early Los Angeles") starting in the 1870s; now operated as a museum
|-
| |2(2329)
| Bolton Hall
| 
| 
| 10116 Commerce Ave.
| Tujunga
| Community hall of utopian community built from native stone and local hillside materials in 1913.  Owned by City of Los Angeles—open to the public.
|-
| |7(CHL 362)(2394)
| Romulo Pico Adobe
| 
| 
| 10940 Sepulveda Blvd.
| Mission Hills
| Two-story adobe residence built in 1834 now operated by San Fernando Valley Historical Society; oldest residence in the San Fernando Valley
|-
| |9
| Shadow Ranch House
| 
| 
| 22633 Vanowen St.
| West Hills
| Two story ranch house built between 1869 and 1872, partly adobe and partly redwood
|-
|  |14
| Chatsworth Community Church
| 
| 
| 22601 Lassen St.
| Chatsworth
| Located in Oakwood Memorial Park, the oldest public building in Chatsworth, built in 1903; originally at 10051 Topanga Canyon Blvd.
|-
|  |23(2355)
| San Fernando Rey Mission
| 
| 
| 15151 San Fernando Mission Blvd.
| Mission Hills
| Spanish mission built in the late 18th century; Convento Building (pictured) was rebuilt after the 1971 earthquake; 17th California Mission.
|-
| 24
| Encino Oak Tree
| 
| 
| Encino
| Oak tree estimated to be 1,000 years old; tree damaged, removed and delisted 1/1/1997; stump pictured at left.
|-
|  |29
| Campo de Cahuenga
| 
| 
| 3919 Lankershim Blvd.
| Studio City
| Site of the signing of the Treaty of Cahuenga, January 13, 1847
|-
|  |31
| Orcutt Ranch Horticulture Center
| 
| 
| 23555 Justice St.
| Canoga Park
| 1920 Rancho Sombra del Roble Spanish Colonial Revival Style adobe residence and estate of early oil tycoon and discoverer of fossils at La Brea Tar Pits
|-
|  |32
| Saint Saviour's Chapel Harvard School
| 
| 
| 3700 Coldwater Canyon Ave.
| Studio City
| Chapel patterned after the Chapel at Rugby School in England; pews face center aisle
|-
|  |41
| 114 Deodar Trees
| 
| 
| White Oak Ave.
| Granada Hills
| Cedrus deodara trees native to the Himalayas, planted in 1932; between San Fernando Mission and San Jose St.
|-
|  |49
| 76 Mature Olive Trees
| 
| 
| Lassen St.
| Chatsworth
| Olive trees planted in late 19th Century lining both sides of Lassen St. between Topanga Canyon Blvd. and Farralone Ave.
|-
|  |50
| Mission Wells and Settling Basin
| 
| 
| Bleeker St. & Havana Ave.
| Sylmar
| Remains of wells built of mission tiles around 1800 by Tongva Indians from the Mission San Fernando Rey de España to provide water to the mission; taken over by the Department of Water and Power in 1919, the  well site is the oldest existing source of water supply in the city, other than the Los Angeles River
|-
| |63
| McGroarty Home
|
| 
| 7570 McGroarty Ter.
| Tujunga
| Fieldstone and stucco house was home to California poet laureate, and Congressman John S. McGroarty, 1933–1944. Owned by City of Los Angeles—open to public.
|-
| |92
| Old Stage Coach Trail Property
| 
| 
| Chatsworth Park South
| Chatsworth
| Old Santa Susana Stage Road over Santa Susana Pass dating to the 1860s linked the San Fernando Valley with Simi Valley and Ventura
|-
| |93
| Pepper Trees
|
| 
| Canoga Ave.
| Woodland Hills
| Approximately 300 California Pepper Trees (Schinus molle) planted for Girard development in the 1920s forming an arch over Canoga Ave. between Ventura Blvd. and Saltillo St.
|-
|  |132
| Stoney Point Outcroppings
| 
| 
| Chatsworth Park North
| Chatsworth
| Picturesque rock outcroppings in northwest corner of Chatsworth
|-
| |133
| Minnie Hill Palmer House
| 
| 
| Chatsworth Park South
| Chatsworth
| Cottage built in 1913, typical of structures built by pioneering homesteaders in the San Fernando Valley
|-
|  |135
| Canoga Mission Gallery
| 
| 
| 23130 Sherman Way
| West Hills
| Mission Revival Style stables built in 1936 by Francis Lederer, converted into a community arts center 1970s
|-
|  |141
| Chatsworth Reservoir Kiln Site
| 
| 
| Southeast of intersection of Woolsey Canyon Rd. and Valley Circle Blvd.
| West Hills
| La Calera; Site of kiln used to make bricks and tiles for the San Fernando Mission; fenced off and not accessible to public
|-
| |152
| Faith Bible Church
| 
| 
| 18531 Gresham St.
| Northridge
| First church built in Northridge; Originally known as the Norwegian Lutheran Church; completed in 1917 in Gothic style
|-
|  |172
| Stonehurst Recreation Center Building
| 
| 
| 9901 Dronfield St.
| Sun Valley
| Building constructed out of native stone c. 1930 by an Indian stonemason
|-
|  |184
| Tower of Wooden Pallets
| 
| 
| 15357 Magnolia Blvd.
| Sherman Oaks
| Tower of 2,000 wooden pallets built in 1951 covering the grave of a child buried in 1869 (site of)
|-
|  |199
| David Familian Chapel of Temple Adat Ari El
|
| 
| 5540 Laurel Canyon Blvd.
| North Hollywood
| Chapel in the first synagogue building in the San Fernando Valley, dedicated in 1949 (site of)
|-
|  |201
| Van Nuys Woman's Club Building
| 
| 
| 14836 Sylvan St.
| Van Nuys
| Craftsman-style building completed in 1917, housing social club
|-
|  |202
| Valley Municipal Building (Van Nuys City Hall)
| 
| 
| 14410 Sylvan St.
| Van Nuys
| Art Deco style municipal building constructed in 1932; one of the Valley's most recognized landmarks
|-
|  |203
| Baird House (Volunteer League Community Center)
| 
| 
| 14603 Hamlin St.
| Van Nuys
| Bungalow-style residence built in 1921; later converted to use by the Volunteer League of the San Fernando Valley
|-
| |204
| Lederer Residence and Immediate Environments
| 
| 
| 23134 Sherman Way
| West Hills
| Mission Revival Style home built starting in 1934 with aged materials by Francis Lederer
|-
| |228
| Laurelwood Apartments
| 
| 
| 11833-11847 Laurelwood Dr.
| Studio City
| Apartment building designed by noted architect, Rudolph Schindler, built in 1948
|-
| |232
| Department of Water and Power Building
| 
| 
| 5106-5108 Lankershim Blvd.
| North Hollywood
| Streamline Moderne structure designed by S. Charles Lee, built in 1939
|-
| |290
| La Reina Theater
| 
| 
| 14626 Ventura Blvd.
| Sherman Oaks
| Streamline Moderne movie theater designed by S. Charles Lee, built in 1938; converted to retail shops in 1987
|-
| |293
| The Magnolia
| 
| 
| 13242 Magnolia Blvd.
| Sherman Oaks
| Spanish Colonial Revival residence built in the late 1920s
|-
| |302(2359)
| Amelia Earhart Branch (North Hollywood Branch Library)
| 
| 
| 5211 N. Tujunga Ave.
| North Hollywood
| Spanish Colonial Revival style branch library built in 1929, originally dedicated to poet Sidney Lanier, later dedicated to aviator Earhart, a North Hollywood resident.
|-
| 405
| Pacific Electric Picover Railway Station
|
| 
| 16710 Sherman Way
| Van Nuys
| Pacific Electric Railway station, built partly in 1917 and partly in 1932; destroyed by fire in 1990
|-
| |484
| Oakridge and Grounds
|
| 
| 18650 Devonshire St.
| Northridge
| English Manor style home built in 1937 for Barbara Stanwyck; later occupied by Jack Oakie; now owned by City of Los Angeles (2010).
|-
| 488
| Canoga Park (originally Owensmouth) Southern Pacific Railroad Station
| 
| 
| 21355 Sherman Way
| Canoga Park
| Spanish Revival railroad station built in 1912; destroyed by fire in 1993
|-
| |573
| El Portal Theater
| 
| 
| 5265-5271 Lankershim Blvd.
| North Hollywood
| Spanish Renaissance Revival theater, office and retail building completed in 1926
|-
| |586(CHL 753)
| San Fernando Pioneer Memorial Cemetery
| 
| 
| 14400 Foothill Blvd.
| Sylmar
| Second oldest cemetery in the San Fernando Valley, holds remains of early pioneers, Civil War veterans and Mission Indians
|-
| |622
| Taft House and Landscaping
| 
| 
| 16745 San Fernando Mission Blvd.
| Granada Hills
| Late 19th Century Victorian house; features wood siding and trim, shingled gambrel roof, double hung windows, dormers and a wraparound porch supported by turned wood columns; home for matriarch of the influential Taft family.
|-
| |629
| Adams Residence
| 
| 
| 7400 Tampa Ave.
| Reseda
| Small house designed by Lloyd Wright, also known as "Mat House"
|-
| |638
| "El Paradiso"
|
| 
| 11468 Dona Cecilia Dr.
| Studio City
| Modern, space-age,  house designed by Raphael Soriano, built in 1964, with 28 aluminum sliding doors
|-
| |644
| Stone House
| 
| 
| 8642 Sunland Blvd.
| Sun Valley
| American Craftsman style house built in 1925, with rock walls, gabled roofs, arched window openings, square tower, and a stone chimney
|-
| |645
| Harvester Farms
| 
| 
| 22049 Devonshire St.
| Chatsworth
| Site was the headquarters of the Palomino Horse Association of America; barn (pictured) was the birthplace of Mr. Ed
|-
| |683
| Chase Knolls Garden Apartments
| 
| 
| 13401 W. Riverside Dr.
| Sherman Oaks
| Dairy farm converted to residential development in the late 1940s; 260 bungalows and apartment homes
|-
| |700
| Canoga Park Branch Library
| 
| 
| 7260 N. Owensmouth Ave.
| Canoga Park
| Branch library built in 1959, designed by Bowerman & Hobson
|-
| |718
| Ward House
|
| 
| 14501 Mulholland Dr.
| Sherman Oaks
|
|-
| |740
| The Serulnic House
|
| 
| 3947 Markridge Rd.
| La Crescenta
| Hillside house designed by Richard Neutra for Neutra's secretary and her husband, a musician with the Los Angeles Philharmonic; built in 1952
|-
| |742
| First Los Angeles Aqueduct Cascades
| 
| 
| Near intersection of Foothill Blvd. and Balboa Blvd.
| Sylmar
| Terminus of the Los Angeles-Owens River Aqueduct, which brings water  from the eastern slopes of the Sierra Nevada to Los Angeles; begun in 1905 and completed in 1913; also California Historic Landmark #653
|-
| |750
| The Munch Box
| 
| 
| 21532 W. Devonshire St.
| Chatsworth
| 1950s hamburger stand with red and yellow coloring and a jet age overhang
|-
| |759
| Gerst Residence
|
| 
| 3437 Adina Dr.
| Studio City
| House built in 1952
|-
| |763
| Studio Theatre at the Denis Building
|
| 
| 3433 Cahuenga Blvd. W.
| Studio City
| Formerly the creative center for Ruth St. Denis, considered the "mother" of American modern dance whose most acclaimed student was Martha Graham; still in use for dance performances
|-
| |782
| El Encanto
|
| 
| 17360 Chase St.
| Northridge
| Barn built in 1942 and converted into a residence by architect Henry Withey in 1947 for General Harris Malasky, who renamed it Black Hawk Ranch
|-
| |793
| La Casa Sueno De Lewis Stone Ranch
|
| 
| 5700 N Rhodes Ave.
| Valley Village
| Spanish Colonial Revival structure built in 1930 with stucco cladding, low pitched tile roof, and decorative glazed tile and ironwork.  Example of "Hollywood movie star" commissioned residential architecture.
|-
| |828
| Harry J. Wolff House
| 
| 
| 4000 N. Sunnyslope Ave.
| Sherman Oaks
| House designed in 1938 by Rudolph Schindler
|-
| |830
| Blarney Castle
|
| 
| 10217 N. Tujunga Canyon Blvd.
| Tujunga
| Well-known Sunland-Tujunga home built in 1919, modeled after an Irish castle
|-
| |838
| Oak Glen Ranch
|
| 
| 9811 N. Hillhaven Ave.
| Tujunga
| Built in 1908 by Flora Morgan, one of the first farmhouses in the Tujunga area
|-
| |841
| Weatherwolde Castle
|
| 
| 10629-10633 N. Commerce Ave.
| Tujunga
| Exotic-style house built in 1928, designed to resemble a French Normandy 16th-century castle
|-
| |848
| Eichler Homes-Foster Residence
| 
| 
| 17145 West Nanette St.
| Granada Hills
| Mid-20th Century post-and-beam house designed by A. Quincy Jones, FAIA, and Frederick Emmons, AIA. for Eichler Homes; epitomizes modernist architecture and indoor-outdoor living with extensive glass walls opening to a large rear yard
|-
| |860
| Kallis House
|
| 
| 3580 N. Multiview Dr.
| Studio City
| House designed by Rudolph Schindler, built in 1946; nestled into a hillside with a dramatic view overlooking of the Valley
|-
| |869
| Bakman House
| 
| 
| 10623 Riverside Dr.
| Toluca Lake
| Spanish Colonial Revival house built in 1929 for Dan Bakman; one of the original homes in Toluca Lake
|-
| |883
| Weddington House
| 
| 
| 11025 W. Weddington St.
| North Hollywood
| First house built in the southeast San Fernando Valley
|-
|  |910
| Riverside-Zoo Drive Bridge, No. 53C1298
| 
| 
| Between Victory Blvd. and Zoo Dr.
| Griffith Park
| Built in 1938, this reinforced concrete bridge exhibits character-defining features of Art Deco-Streamline Moderne bridge design.
|-
| |911(2509)
| Van Nuys Branch Library
| 
| 
| 14555 Sylvan St.
| Van Nuys
| Old branch library building (1927)--fine example of Spanish colonial style—no longer used as a library
|-
|  |917
| Roland E. Hill House
|
| 
| 3268 N. Bennett Dr
| Studio City
| French Eclectic storybook style, designed by Roland E. Hill, 1926.
|-
| |918
| Lydecker Hilltop House
|
| 
| 3820 Buena Park Dr.
| Studio City
| Streamline Moderne house built in 1939 for Howard "Babe" Lydecker known as one of Hollywood's early geniuses of special effects
|-
| |932
| Clarence G. Badger Residence
|
| 
| 7128 Woodrow Wilson Dr.
| Studio City
| Spanish Colonial Revival house built in 1916 for early motion picture director Clarence Badger
|-
| |933
| Kramer House
|
| 
| 12556 N. Middlecoff Pl.
| Granada Hills
| Mid-Century Modern Ranch, 1966.
|-
| |941
| Stonehurst House
|
| 
| 10021 N. Stonehurst Ave.
| Sun Valley
| Residence built 1924 by Daniel Lawrence Montelongo, a stonemason of Native American descent. Craftsman style with Spanish Colonial Revival elements.
|-
| |946
| Verdugo Hills of Peace Pioneer Cemetery
|
| 
| 7000 Parsons Trail
| Tujunga
| Established by Marshall Valentine Hartranft in 1922.
|-
| |952
| Kaye Residence
|
| 
| 4754 Vanalden Ave.
| Tarzana
| Designed by Gregory Ain, built 1963.
|-
| |974
| Van Dekker House
| 
| 
| 19950 W. Collier St.
| Woodland Hills
| Modern 1940 house designed by Rudolph Schindler.
|-
| |975
| Sepulveda Unitarian Universalist Society Sanctuary ("The Onion")
| 
| 
| 9550 N. Haskell Avenue
| North Hills
| "Built in 1964... Modern style church sanctuary... hosted several political events opposing the Vietnam War... designed by student of Richard Neutra."
|-
| |976
| Corbin Palms House
| 
| 
| 6118 Jumilla Ave.
| Woodland Hills
| "Built in 1955... Modern Ranch style single-family residence designed by... Palmer & Krisel, who designed several Mid-Century Modern neighborhoods."
|-
| |977
| Idle Hour Café
| 
| 
| 4824 Vineland Ave.
| North Hollywood
| "Constructed in 1941... appears to be the last barrel-shaped building in Los Angeles from the early 20th century period of Programmatic design."
|-
| |978
| Lankershim Reading Room
| 
| 
| 10940 Sepulveda Blvd.
| Mission Hills
| "One-story, octagonal-shaped [1904] structure... last remaining building from the Lankershim Ranch." Relocated to the park at the Rómulo Pico Adobe (LAHCM #7) in 2001.
|-
|  |981
| Margaret and Harry Hay House
|
|
| 3132 N. Oakcrest Dr.
|
| International Style by Gregory Ain, 1939, for Harry Hay, founder of the Mattachine Society.
|-
| |992
| T.R. Craig Residence “Peppergate Ranch”
| 
| 
| 8431 Pinelake Drive
| West Hills
| "One-story single-family residence, designed by Paul R. Williams in the Ranch Style, built in 1939.Paul Revere Williams: T.R. Craig (Harris) Residence - Photo gallery and history. 
|-
|}

Non-HCM historic sites recognized by state and nation

See also

Lists of L.A. Historic-Cultural Monuments
 Historic-Cultural Monuments in Downtown Los Angeles
 Historic-Cultural Monuments on the East and Northeast Sides
 Historic-Cultural Monuments in the Harbor area
 Historic-Cultural Monuments in Hollywood

 Historic-Cultural Monuments in Silver Lake, Angelino Heights, and Echo Park
 Historic-Cultural Monuments in South Los Angeles
 Historic-Cultural Monuments on the Westside
 Historic-Cultural Monuments in the Wilshire and Westlake areas

Other
 City of Los Angeles' Historic Preservation Overlay Zones
 National Register of Historic Places listings in Los Angeles
 National Register of Historic Places listings in Los Angeles County
 List of California Historical Landmarks

References

External links
 
 official Designated L.A. Historic-Cultural Monuments (LAHCM) website — with 'ever-updated' LAHCM list via PDF link.
 Los Angeles HCM Report for the North Valley — L.A. City Planning Department. Los Angeles HCM Report for the South Valley
 City of Los Angeles Map, with community districts. — via Given Place Media. Big Orange Landmarks:  "Exploring the Landmarks of Los Angeles, One Monument at a Time" — online photos and in-depth history of L.A.H.C.Monuments homepage, see “Landmarks by Community Planning Area” SFV area links.  — website curator: Floyd B. Bariscale.''

 
San Fernando Valley
Los Angeles-related lists

Historic-Cultural Monuments